Padmavati was a queen of the third Mauryan Emperor, Ashoka and the mother of his son, the crown prince Kunala. She was also the grandmother of Emperor Samprati.

Notes

References
 
 

Year of death unknown
Wives of Ashoka
3rd-century BC women